The 1930 SMU Mustangs football team represented Southern Methodist University (SMU) as a member the Southwest Conference (SWC) during the 1930  college football season. Led by 11th head coach Ray Morrison, the Mustangs compiled and overall record of 6–3–1 overall with a mark of 2–2–1 in conference play, placing fourth.

Schedule

References

SMU
SMU Mustangs football seasons
SMU Mustangs football